Frank Hunter and Bill Tilden defeated defending champions Jacques Brugnon and Henri Cochet in the final, 1–6, 4–6, 8–6, 6–3, 6–4 to win the gentlemen's doubles tennis title at the 1927 Wimbledon Championship.

Seeds

  Jacques Brugnon /  Henri Cochet (final)
  Jean Borotra /  René Lacoste (third round)
  Frank Hunter /  Bill Tilden (champions)
  Jack Condon /  Louis Raymond (semifinals)

Draw

Finals

Top half

Section 1

The nationality of HG Hellier is unknown.

Section 2

Bottom half

Section 3

The nationality of NB Deane is unknown.

Section 4

References

External links

Men's Doubles
Wimbledon Championship by year – Men's doubles